English electronic music producer Burial has released two studio albums, two compilation albums, one mix album, twelve extended plays and ten singles. Burial debuted in May 2005 with the release of his debut extended play South London Boroughs on the Hyperdub label. His eponymous debut studio album followed in May 2006 and was praised by music critics for its unique incorporation of 2-step garage, ambient, downtempo, dubstep and trip hop styles. Following the releases of the extended plays Distant Lights (2006) and Ghost Hardware (2007), Burial released his second studio album Untrue in November 2007 to critical acclaim. It peaked at number 58 on the UK Albums Chart and at number 57 on the Ultratop 50 chart for the Belgian region of Flanders. Untrue later received nominations for the Mercury Prize and the Shortlist Music Prize, with the album experiencing a 1004% sales increase in the week following the Mercury Prize awards ceremony.

Following the release of Untrue, Burial issued several collaborative singles with other artists—"Moth" / "Wolf Cub" with producer Four Tet, "Ego" / "Mirror" with Four Tet and musician Thom Yorke, and "Four Walls" / "Paradise Circus" with trip hop group Massive Attack—and performed production work on several songs for British singer Jamie Woon's Mirrorwriting (2011), as well as Kode9 and The Spaceape's 2008 track "Konfusion Dub". In March 2011, Burial released the extended play Street Halo; Kindred followed in February 2012. A single compilation of the two extended plays was released in February 2012. Burial has since released several succeeding EPs, including Truant / Rough Sleeper (2012), Rival Dealer (2013), Young Death / Nightmarket (2016) and Subtemple / Beachfires (2017).

Albums

Studio albums

Compilation albums

Mix albums

Extended plays

Singles

Other appearances

Remix work

Radio mix appearances

References

External links
 Burial at Hyperdub
 Burial at AllMusic
 
 

Discographies of British artists
Electronic music discographies